Adolf von Thadden (7 July 1921 – 16 July 1996) was a German far-right politician. Born into a leading Pomeranian landowning family, he was the half-brother of Elisabeth von Thadden, a prominent critic of the Nazis who was executed by the Nazi government in September 1944.

Early life
Thadden was born at the noble estate of Gut Trieglaff, near Greifenberg, Pomerania on 7 July 1921. He was a member of the Thadden family, one of Pomerania's oldest Junker families and his father was a prominent local magistrate. He educated at the gymnasium in Greifenberg and subsequently studied agriculture and economics. On 1 September 1939, he became a member of the Nazi Party.

He served as a lieutenant with the Wehrmacht in the Second World War, suffering a number of battle injuries during the conflict. A brigade adjutant in the artillery section, he was captured near the end of the war by Polish forces. Thadden later went to court to sue over rumours that he had collaborated with the Poles during his imprisonment. He was successful in his case.

He escaped captivity in November 1946 and fled to the British Zone of Occupation, finding work with the British Property Control in Göttingen, where he settled.

Political career
After the war, Thadden entered politics as a member of the Deutsche Rechtspartei and its successor the Deutsche Reichspartei.  As a member of both, he served as a councilman in Göttingen from 1948 to 1958. Elected to the Bundestag in 1949, he was the second youngest member and was thus addressed by an SPD member as 'Bubi', a nickname that stuck with him. He became the main writer on the party organ Reichsruf, gaining a reputation both for his demagogy and his extensive use of humour and wit. He remained a Bundestag member to 1953 and again from 1955 to 1959, was a Senator from 1952 to 1958 and a member of the Landtag of Lower Saxony from 1956 to 1959.

In the 1950s he was befriended by Winifred Wagner, whose grandson Gottfried Wagner later recalled that 

Having been deputy to leader Wilhelm Meinberg, Thadden became chairman of the Deutsche Reichspartei in 1961 and in this position was one of the signatories of the European Declaration at Venice which set up the National Party of Europe. Thadden was personally close to the British Union Movement leader Oswald Mosley, on whose initiative the NPE was founded, and was attracted to his concept of Europe a Nation. He specifically denied any accusations of neo-Nazism levelled at him, arguing that he was a supporter of conservative nationalism. However, he was frequently labelled a neo-Nazi due to his prominent opposition to the notion of any German guilt for the Second World War.

NPD
Thadden played a leading role in formation of the National Democratic Party of Germany (NPD) by merging his party with a number of other rightist groups, including a revived German National People's Party in 1964. He was initially overlooked as leader in favour of Friedrich Thielen of the German Party. Thadden regularly clashed with the more moderate Thielen and both men were involved in several lawsuits against each other, aimed at gaining control of the NPD and ousting their rival from membership.

Thadden was eventually appointed chairman in 1967. He moved the party to the right, bringing in policies such as withdrawal from NATO, a return of Danzig to a united Germany, wide-ranging reform of the constitution and possibly a second Anschluss. In one of his more widely reported activities, Thadden accidentally referred to the party as National Socialists rather than National Democrats in a television interview, something that was frequently brought up by critics who accused Thadden and his party of neo-Nazism. He remained leader until 1971, achieving strong showings in regional elections, although the party failed to gain representation in the Bundestag under his leadership (and have never managed to do so). Although a loyal supporter of his successor, Martin Mussgnug, Thadden eventually left the NPD in 1975 after Gerhard Frey, who had previously been a harsh critic of von Thadden, was appointed Federal Administrator of the party.

He left active politics in 1974 and worked for a construction firm, although he remained as chief editor of the Deutsche Wochenzeitung into the 1980s. He maintained an interest in publishing for several years and was reported as acting on behalf of the Gesellschaft für freie Publizistik, a far-right journalism organisation linked to the NPD in 1981 and 1982.

Death
Thadden died on 16 July 1996, in Bad Oeynhausen, at the age of 75. Since Thadden's death, it has been claimed that he was a secret agent of the United Kingdom's external security agency, MI6.

References

1921 births
1996 deaths
People from Gryfice County
People from the Province of Pomerania
Nazi Party politicians
Deutsche Rechtspartei politicians
Deutsche Reichspartei politicians
National Democratic Party of Germany politicians
German Army officers of World War II
Leaders of political parties in Germany
German anti-communists
Members of the Bundestag for Lower Saxony
German nationalists
Members of the Landtag of Lower Saxony
Political party founders